Dimitar Dimitrov Gospodinov (born 20 February 1974) is a Bulgarian former racing cyclist.

Gospodinov represented Bulgaria in the road race at the 2004 Summer Olympics. He also won the Tour of Turkey in 1996, the Tour of Bulgaria in 2001 and 2002. He was also the national champion of Bulgaria in both the time trial and road race in 2000.

Major results

1996
 1st  Overall Tour of Turkey
2000
 National Road Championships
1st  Time trial
1st  Road race
2001
 1st Overall Tour of Bulgaria
2002
 1st Overall Tour of Bulgaria
2003
 2nd Les Boucles du Sud Ardèche
2004
 4th Overall Circuit de Lorraine
2006
 1st Stage 5b Tour of Bulgaria (TTT)
 2nd Overall Tour of Romania

References

1974 births
Living people
Bulgarian male cyclists
Olympic cyclists of Bulgaria
Cyclists at the 2004 Summer Olympics